Depressaria eryngiella is a moth of the family Depressariidae. It is found in France, Spain and Ukraine.

References

Moths described in 1881
Depressaria
Moths of Europe